Girls in Love is the first book in the Girls series, written by Dame Jacqueline Wilson, DBE, a noted English author who writes fiction for children and young teenagers. It was first published in 1997. The other books in the series are Girls under Pressure (1998), Girls out Late (1999), and Girls in Tears (2002).

Plot summary
The novel is narrated by Eleanor Allard, a.k.a. Ellie. The book opens with Ellie's Family holiday to Wales where she meets a nerdy boy named Dan. Dan falls for Ellie and asks her out but his feelings are not reciprocated and Ellie turns him down. Ellie arrives back at school after the summer holidays to find her best friend, Nadine, has a new boyfriend named Liam, her other friend, Magda, soon asks a boy named Greg out as well. Feeling left out, Ellie makes up a character as her boyfriend, who is a boy that she sees nearly everyday on her way to school. She names him Dan (like the nerdy boy she met in Wales) and describes him as a 15 year old handsome boy. Magda and Ellie soon start to think that Liam is using Nadine for sex as Nadine comes to school depressed sometimes. With her big mouth, Magda accidentally mentions it to Nadine which upsets her. But eventually she forgives them both.

One night on Magda's birthday the three girls sneak out to a night club called "Seventh Heaven" and it is revealed that Liam was only using Nadine for sex when they meet some other girls that had been Liam's victims. Liam had planned to break up with her after she 'put out' or, had sex with him. At a friend's party Dan turns up unannounced, and Ellie is mortified. Soon the truth about Dan is revealed to Ellie's friends; however, when gatecrashers arrive at the party and cause trouble, Dan intervenes and saves the day. To Ellie's surprise, this impresses Magda and Nadine and causes Ellie to rethink her first impressions of Dan. The book ends with Ellie and Dan's first kiss in  the room.

Characters

The girls
Ellie - Witty and artistic, the book starts by meeting a thirteen-year-old Ellie in Year 9. She has curly hair, a passion for art and is self-conscious about her weight and appearance.
Magda - Ellie and Nadine's best friend whom they befriended at the start of secondary school. Magda is beautiful, popular, confident and optimistic. She attracts a lot of male attention.
Nadine - Ellie's childhood best friend. Nadine is a tall, thin and striking goth. Her wild, rebellious attitude tends to get her into trouble.

Ellie's family
Benedict "Eggs" - Ellie's younger half-brother.
Dad - Ellie's father, remarried Anna after Ellie's mother died. He is an artist and tutor at the local college.
Anna - Ellie's step mother, who is much younger than her father. Attractive and kind, she and Ellie often fight despite the fact they truly care for each other.

Other characters
Russell - Ellie's boyfriend, who is first introduced in the 3rd book, Girls Out Late. Like Ellie, he is interested in art. He is two years older than Ellie, and is in Year Eleven at his school, Halmer High.
Dan - Ellie's "kind-of" boyfriend before Russell. He should be in Year Eight, but because of his intelligence he was moved up a year, to year Nine. They met at during a summer holiday in Wales, and they wrote letters to each other when they got back. Dan 'stayed' with Ellie once. Dan now has another girlfriend, Gail.
Natasha - Nadine's little sister. She is a spoiled and slightly manipulative little girl who acts cute in front of her parents, but is a nightmare in front of Nadine, Ellie, and Magda. She is friends with Benedict "Eggs".
Kevin - An older student whom Ellie develops a crush on in the first book. Later, they become friends and Ellie starts to flirt with Kevin, but to her shock she finds out that he is gay. Ellie has a habit of 'bumping into him'.
Liam - Nadine's sleazy, but extremely good-looking, ex-boyfriend who had a reputation for using girls for sex. Nadine claimed to be in love with him in the book Girls In Love.
Greg - Magda's boyfriend, a student at Anderson High School for Boys. He wears a lot of hair gel to darken his naturally red hair. He gives Magda one of his pet hamsters in the book Girls In Tears.
Mrs. Henderson - Ellie, Magda and Nadine's form tutor and P.E teacher in Year Nine. She is usually strict and often unfair with the girls, but she becomes very concerned with Ellie in the book Girls Under Pressure when she notices how much weight Ellie loses.
Mr Windsor (Mr Green) - Ellie, Magda and Nadine's art teacher, who Magda has a crush on.

TV drama series
There is also a TV drama series, Girls in Love, which is based on Wilson's book. It was produced by Granada Television and aired on ITV.

British young adult novels
Novels by Jacqueline Wilson
1997 British novels
Corgi books